Ron Thompson may refer to:

 Ron Thompson (actor) (born 1941), American actor
 Ron Thompson (blues guitarist) (1953–2020), American blues guitarist
 Ron Thompson (footballer, born 1921) (1921–1988), English football inside forward
 Ron Thompson (footballer, born 1932), English football wing half
 Ron Thompson (West Virginia politician) (born 1966), American politician from West Virginia
 Ron Thompson (Australian politician) (1917–2006), Australian trade unionist and politician
 Ronald L. Thompson (1899–1986), American politician from Pennsylvania

See also
 Ronnie Thompson (disambiguation)
 Ronald Thomson (disambiguation)